MacCurdy is a surname. Notable people with the name include:

George Grant MacCurdy, American anthropologist
Jean MacCurdy, American television executive
John T. MacCurdy, Canadian psychiatrist
William K. MacCurdy, American engineer

See also
Samuel MacCurdy Greer, Irish politician
Macurdy, surname
McCurdy (surname)

Patronymic surnames